Neil King is a Canadian politician. He represented the electoral district of Bonavista in the Newfoundland and Labrador House of Assembly as a member of the Liberal Party from 2015 until 2019. He was elected in the 2015 provincial election for the district of Bonavista and was defeated in the 2019 provincial election. In the 2021 Newfoundland and Labrador general election, King ran as an independent candidate after being rejected as the Liberal candidate. He lost, finishing third.

King previously served in the Canadian Navy.

References

Living people
Liberal Party of Newfoundland and Labrador MHAs
21st-century Canadian politicians
Year of birth missing (living people)